Brazilian Press is a Brazilian, Portuguese language newspaper in the United States, with the largest circulation of any US Brazilian newspaper in 11 states. Their offices are at 78 Fillmore St, in the Ironbound neighborhood of Newark, New Jersey. This neighborhood has a strong Portuguese and Brazilian community.

History and current management
The President, Silvio De Souza, founded the company in 1997. His wife, Daniele De Souza, is a supervisor at the company.

External links
 Brazilian Press Home Page

References

The MetroWest Daily (Massachusetts), August 5, 2002 "Brazilian press links immigrants to homeland," By Liz Mineo
  

Brazilian-American culture in New Jersey
Newspapers established in 1997
Portuguese-language newspapers published in the United States
Companies based in Newark, New Jersey
Newspapers published in New Jersey
Portuguese-American culture in New Jersey
Non-English-language newspapers published in New Jersey
Mass media in Newark, New Jersey